The State University of Minas Gerais. (UEMG) is a Brazilian public university. It is the third largest university in the state of Minas Gerais, second only to the Federal University of Minas Gerais and the Federal University of Uberlândia. It was founded in 1989 in Belo Horizonte, Minas Gerais, Brazil. Besides Belo Horizonte, its campuses are distributed across several cities in the Minas Gerais states.

History 
UEMG was founded by a regulation from Minas Gerais state constitution from 1989. which allowed the independent institutions of higher education owned by the state government to collaborate,
or to be absorbed as UEMG's campi. Those institutions were the following:

 Fundação Faculdade de Filosofia, Ciências e Letras de Carangola
 Fundação Educacional do Vale do Jequitinhonha
 Fundação de Ensino Superior de Passos Visite o Portal FESP
 Fundação Educacional de Lavras
 Fundação de Ensino e Pesquisa do Sul de Minas
 Fundação Educacional de Divinópolis
 Fundação Educacional de Patos de Minas
 Fundação Educacional de Ituiutaba 
 Fundação Cultural Campanha da Princesa

In addition to the institutions owned by the Minas Gerais state, the following public institutions were also incorporated:
 Fundação Mineira de Arte Aleijadinho (FUMA)
 Fundação Escola Guignard
 Curso de Pedagogia - Instituto de Educação
 Serviço de Orientação e Seleção Profissional

External links 

Universities and colleges in Minas Gerais
Educational institutions established in 1989
1989 establishments in Brazil
State universities in Brazil